Jacarilla (Valencian: Xacarella) is a municipality and village in the province of Alicante and autonomous community of Valencia, Spain.

Places of interest
The Palace is a place of significant historical interest in the village. The magnificent country palace was built and owned by the Marques de Fontabla about 90 years ago. However he died in the 1930s and his daughter married and moved away.  The Fontabla family were noble land owners who owned most of the land in the village for centuries. In 1947 they divided up the land and sold it to the workers, bringing prosperity to the village. The main source of income has always been agriculture, especially citrus fruits, oranges and lemons.

References

 

Municipalities in the Province of Alicante